The Leinster Junior Club Football Championship is a Gaelic football competition between the winners of the Junior football competitions in 10 counties of Leinster, the Intermediate football champions of Kilkenny, the Intermediate football runners-up of Longford and the Senior football champions of Europe. The winner then contests the All-Ireland Junior Club Football Championship semi finals against the winners from one of the other three provinces.

Teams

Qualification

Roll of honour

See also
 Munster Junior Club Football Championship
 Connacht Junior Club Football Championship
 Ulster Junior Club Football Championship

References

Leinster GAA club football competitions